Caulanthus hallii is a species of flowering plant in the family Brassicaceae known by the common name Hall's wild cabbage.

Distribution
It is native to southern California and northern Baja California.

It grows in the Colorado Desert (western Sonoran Desert), Mojave Desert sky islands,  and the dry eastern Peninsular Ranges slopes.

Description
Caulanthus hallii is an annual herb producing a hollow stem fringed at the base with long, deeply cut leaves which are hairless or sometimes bristly.

The greenish yellow flower has a coat of hairy sepals over narrow, pale petals. The fruit is a silique up to about 11 centimeters long.

References

External links
Jepson Manual Treatment of Caulanthus hallii
USDA Plants Profile for Caulanthus hallii
Caulanthus hallii — U.C. Photo gallery

hallii
Flora of California
Flora of Baja California
Flora of the California desert regions
Flora of the Sonoran Deserts
Natural history of the Mojave Desert
Natural history of the Peninsular Ranges
Plants described in 1923